The following is a list of Greek billionaires. It is based on an annual assessment of wealth and assets compiled and published by Forbes magazine in March every year.

2022
source: 2022 The World's Billionaires

2021
source: 2021 The World's Billionaires

2021 Greek Nationals
List of Greek-American, Greek-Cypriots and Greek-Russian Billionaires

2020
source: 2020 The World's Billionaires

2019
source: 2019 The World's Billionaires

2018
source: 2018 The World's Billionaires

2013
source: 2013 The World's Billionaires

Other millionaires 
source: The Ultra Rich Greeks

See also 
Economy of Greece
List of countries by number of billionaires
List of companies of Greece
List of wealthiest families
List of Cypriot billionaires by net worth

References
 

Net worth
Lists of people by wealth
Economy of Greece-related lists
Greek billionaires